The Church of Norway held elections on September 11 and 12 2011. The election dates and poll stations were the same as those of the municipal elections for Norway).

The nation's 11  bishoprics were elected.

Diocesan councils 

In the Church of the campaign was created two lists of recommendations of candidates to vote for, one from the campaign, "Grandfather Child" and one from the alliance, "Raus national church." Among the 77 representatives were elected, was 34 on the list to sire children, while 29 were on the list to Generous national church.

Results of direct elections 

55 representatives were elected to the country's 11 diocesan council in the direct election round. 32 of the representatives were re-elected from the previous period. 53% of the elected representatives are women, and the average age is 47.4 years.

 Diocese of Oslo
 Frederick Arstad, student, Klemetsrud, 22 years
 Marius Berge Eide, student, Frogner, 21år
 Kristin Gunleiksrud, advisor, Asker, 50 years
 Karin -Elin Berg, senior adviser, Mark, 33 years
 Harald Hegstad, Professor, Mortensrud, 51
 Knut Lundby, Professor, Haslum, 63 years
 Aud Kvalbein, deputy mayor, Nordstrand, 63 years
 Diocese of Hamar
 Ingrun Jule, department, Elverum, 40 years
 Sigmund Rye Berg, retired, Stange, 72 years
 Anne-Lise Brenna Ording, occupational therapist, Wings, 24 years
 Reidar Asgard, Chairman, Southern Elvdal, 68 years
 Eleanor Brenna, student / environmental therapist, Brøttum, 52 years
 Tori Kristiansen, kindergarten boards, Vardal, 50 years
 Roald Braathen, retirement, Brandbu, 65 years
 Diocese of Stavanger
 Svein Arne Lindø, care manager, Riska, 58 years
 Marie Klakegg Gras Tveit, finance trainee, Viking and Orstad, 26 years
 Liv Hjørdis Glette, teacher, Our Saviour (Haugesund), 52 years
 Leif Christian Andersen, nurse, Bekkefaret, 26 years
 Silje Arnevik Barkved, theology student, Lura, 25 years
 Tor Soppeland, farmer, Årdal, 63 years
 Gyrid Espeland, Section Chief, Eigerøy, 58 years
 Diocese of Sør-Hålogaland
 Einar Bovim, Assistant Professor, Narvik, 31 years
 Day Jostein Fjærvoll, retirement, Hadsel 64 years of
 Mari Haave Dvergsdal, student, Bodin, 21 years
 Reimar Brown, principal, Øksnes, 59 years
 Tanja Nyjordet, supervisor, northern Rana, 44 years
 Marit Hermstad, department, Sandnessjøen, 57 years
 Trude Stensvik Kaspersen, accountant, Henningsvær, 37
 North Hålogaland
 Gunhild Marie Andreassen, personnel manager, Kvaløy, 42 years
 Andreas Gotliebsen, student, Kanebogen, 23 years
 Nils N. Mathis Eira, bus driver/owner, Kautokeino, 67 years
 Geir Ludvigsen, university, Tromsø Cathedral, 43
 Mette-Marit Sørum Granerud, lecturer, Alta, 53 years
 Anne Marie Hill, Assistant Professor, Kvæfjord, 67 years
 Jarle-Wilfred Andreassen, department, Nesseby, 53 years

These dioceses had direct election of four members, indirect election of three members:
 Diocese of Borg
 Brown Anne Andersen, teacher/counselor, Kråkerøy 62 years
 Frøydis Ingjerd No, student, Hurdal, 24 years
 Aarflot Andreas Henriksen, student, Hillsborough, 22 years
 Jofrid Trandem Myhre, head/senior tax lawyer, Jeløy, 47 years
 Diocese of Nidaros
 Ola Torgeir Lånke, former Member of Parliament, Rennebu, 63 years
 Solveig Kopperstad Bratseth, senior advisor NAV, Tempe, 53 years
 Trude Holm, county council group leader, Stiklestad, 59 years
 Grete Folden, farmer / general manager, Beitstad, 43

These dioceses had direct election of three members, indirect election of four members:

 Diocese of Tunsberg
 Harald Askeland, Professor, Torød, 48 years
 Ingjerd Sørhaug Bratsberg, teacher / nurse, Sande, 43
 Hilde-Solveig Trøgstad Johnsen, student, Lier, 21 years
 Diocese of Agder og Telemark
 Øivind Benestad, Information Officer, Vågsbygd, 57 years
 Jan Olav Olsen, the principal, Gjerstad, 61
 Kjetil Drangsholt, doctor, Cathedral, 61
 Diocese of Bjorgvin
 Cathrine Halstensen, einingsleiar, Bergen Cathedral, 33
 Egil Morland, college professor, Mountain, 61
 Nils Dagestad, farmer / pensioner, Voss, 68 years
 Diocese of Møre
 Modulf Aukan, farmer, Tustna, 63 years
 Målfrid Synnøve Isene, student, Volda, 22 years
 Lisbeth May Hovlid Aurdal, mission consultant, Sykkylven, 52 years

Results from indirect ballot 

22 employees' representatives, one from representant Deaf Church and 3 Sami representatives were elected by their own choice. The bishop of each diocese has a permanent place in the Diocesan Council. In addition, selected the newly elected parish councils in the six dioceses of the 22 representatives in the indirect election round.

 Diocese of Oslo
Priest: Anne Berit Løvstad Evangeline, chaplain, Rødtvedt
 Children's Church staff: Elin Oveland, religious education director, Østenstad
 Deaf Church : Knut Rune Saltnes
 Bishop: Ole Christian Kvarme
 Diocese of Hamar
 Priest: Ole Kristian Farmer, pastor, Elverum
 Children's Church staff: Dag Landmark, churchwarden, Gjøvik
 Bishop : Solveig Fiske
 Diocese of Stavanger
 Priest: Berit Magnhild Espeseth, pastor, Sørnes
 Children's Church staff: Terje Fjeldheim, churchwarden, Tysvær
 Bishop: Erling J. Pettersen
 Diocese of South Hålogaland
 Priest: Kristine Sandmæl, pastor, Vogan
 Children's Church staff: Arne Tveit, churchwarden, Vestvågøy
 Sami Representative: Mareno Mikkelsen
 Bishop: Tor Berger Jørgensen
 Diocese of Nord-Hålogaland
 Priest: Sigurd Skollevoll, Dean, Senja
 Children's Church staff: Oddhild Klevberg, catechist, Alta
 Sami Representative: Liv Eli Holmestrand
 Bishop: Per Oskar Kjølaas
 Diocese of Borg
 Priest: Arne Risholm Leon, pastor, Greåker
 Children's Church staff: Jan-Erik Sundby, churchwarden, Sarpsborg
 Bishop: Atle Sommerfeldt
 Erling Birkedal, researcher, Nittedal
 Bjorn Solberg, principal, Mysen
 Anne Gangnes Kleiven, teacher, Romskog
 Diocese of Nidaros
 Priest: Kjartan Bergslid, pastor, South Innherad
 Children's Church staff: Helge Nilsen, churchwarden, Åfjord
 Sami Representative: Nils Bertil Inari Jønsson
 Bishop: Thu Singsaas
 Agnes Sophie Gjeset, year-Seamen's Church, Fosnes
 Gabriel Eikli, senior, Orkdal
 Gunnar Winther, head of the unit, Steinkjer
 Diocese of Tunsberg
 Priest: Silvie Kristin Lewin, Vicar, Ramnes
 Children's Church staff: Kjell Fred Dekko, churchwarden, Al
 Bishop: Laila Riksaasen Dahl
 Ingvild Kaslegard, teacher / Gestalt, Al
 Merethe Kjønnø Dahl, supervisor, Horten
 Kjell Rune Wirges, const. section, Nanset
 Ingjerd Breian Hedberg, indep. employed, Sem
 Diocese of Agder og Telemark
 Priest: Berit Bowerbank, pastor, Sauherad and Nes
 Children's Church staff: Geir Ivar Bjerkestrand, organist, Froland
 Bishop: Olav Skjevesland
 Torstein Nordal, student, Nissedal
 Karen Junker, Director of Education, Barbu
 Berit Haugland, college lecturer, Kragerø
 Martin Jakobsen, student, Oddernes
 Diocese of Bjorgvin
 Priest: Ivar Braut, pastor, Birkeland
 Children's Church staff: Tone Synnøve Øygard Steinkopf, cantor, Vaksdal
 Bishop: Halvor Nordhaug
 Inger Helene Something Violence Nordeide, development manager, Forde
 Julie Ane Odegaard, PhD, Løvstakksiden
 Berit Nøst Dale, college lecturer, Meland
 Kari Synnøve Muri, physiotherapist / Public Health Coordinator, Olden
 Diocese of Møre
 Priest: Per Eilert Orten, pastor, Aure
 Children's Church staff: Kari Vatne, church educator, Spjelkavik
 Bishop : Ingeborg Midttømme
 Eldar Husøy, teacher, Ulstein
 Ann-Kristin Sørvik, verger / indep. employed, Bremsnes
 Hilde Bergsfjord Brunvoll, teacher / artist, Bolsøy
 Marianne Hermann Brekken, student, Myrbostad

Commentaries to the elections
"Two movements have, as in 2009, made their mark before the elections ... regarding homosexuality and questions about ekteskapsliturgi for gay people. The one group calls itself MorFarBarn while the counterpart calls itself Raus folkekirke "

See also
 Church of Norway election, 2009
 Church of Norway election, 2015

References

Church of Norway
Christian church elections
State church elections
State church of Norway elections
Norway
September 2011 events in Europe
Non-partisan elections